is a Japanese food manufacturing company headquartered in Chiyoda-ku, Tokyo, Japan with overseas operations. Nisshin Seifun is listed on the Nikkei 225.

Founded in 1900, the company is currently headed by chairman Osamu Shoda, the younger brother of Empress Michiko, and president Hiroshi Oeda.

Subsidiaries

Subsidiary of Nisshin Seifun Group include:

 Nisshin Flour Milling Company
 Nisshin Foods Inc
 Nisshin Pharma Inc
 Nisshin Petfoods Inc
 Nisshin Engineering Inc
 Oriental Yeast Company Limited
 NBC Meshtec Inc — screen-printing materials, mesh products 
 Initio Food Inc — ready to eat foods
 Rogers Foods Ltd. — milled products; plants in Armstrong and Chilliwack, Canada

Operations

Nisshin Seifun has operations outside Japan:

 Germany - offices
 Canada - production plants
 US - offices and production plants
 China - offices and production plants
 Thailand - production plants
 Netherlands - offices
 New Zealand - production plants
 Indonesia - offices

Trademarks

Nisshin Seifun holds the Welna trademark.

References

External links
  

Japanese companies established in 1900
Food and drink companies established in 1900
Fuyo Group
Companies listed on the Tokyo Stock Exchange
Food and drink companies based in Tokyo